Four Freedoms were the themes of Franklin Delano Roosevelt's 1941 State of the Union Address.

Four Freedoms may also refer to:

Tributes to FDR's 1941 State of the Union Address
Four Freedoms (Norman Rockwell)
Four Freedoms Award
Four Freedoms Monument
Four Freedoms Plaza
Franklin D. Roosevelt Four Freedoms Park

Other
Four Freedoms of the European Single Market: free movement of goods, capital, services and persons
Four Belgian constitutional Freedoms: free worship and culture, free press, free association and free choice of school system
Four Freedoms (free software)
Four Freedoms (novel), a 2009 historical novel by John Crowley
"The Four Freedoms", a 1945 short story by Edward Newhouse